Aravus is a village in the Tegh Municipality of the Syunik Province in Armenia.

Demographics

Population 
The Statistical Committee of Armenia reported its population as 227 in 2010, an increase from 168 at the 2001 census.

References 

Populated places in Syunik Province